Bifurcium is a genus of sea snails in the family Columbellidae, the dove snails. There is one species in the genus, Bifurcium bicanaliferum. The type species was found off the Galapagos Islands.

References

Columbellidae